Joanna Brown (born November 12, 1992) is a Canadian triathlete. Brown has been part of the Canadian national team since 2011.

Career
At the 2015 Pan American Games in Toronto, Brown finished in 13th position. Brown competed at the 2018 Commonwealth Games, and won the bronze medal in the individual race, the first medal for Canada at the games. She later finished fourth in the mixed relay.

In July 2021, Brown was named to Canada's 2020 Olympic team.

References

External links
ITU Bio

1992 births
Canadian female triathletes
Living people
Triathletes at the 2018 Commonwealth Games
Commonwealth Games competitors for Canada
Pan American Games competitors for Canada
Triathletes at the 2015 Pan American Games
Commonwealth Games bronze medallists for Canada
Triathletes at the 2020 Summer Olympics
Olympic triathletes of Canada
21st-century Canadian women
Medallists at the 2018 Commonwealth Games
Commonwealth Games medallists in triathlon